The Weißhorn is a mountain in the Südtiroler Unterland in South Tyrol, Italy.

References 
 Alpenverein South Tyrol

External links 

Mountains of the Alps
Mountains of South Tyrol
Fiemme Mountains